Oriol Junyent Monuera (born July 1, 1976) is a retired professional Spanish basketball player and the current manager of the reserve team of Obradoiro CAB.

Playing career
On the 1998–99 was champion of the Liga ACB and the Korać Cup with FC Barcelona.

On 2009–2010 LEB season was LEB Oro champion with CAI Zaragoza, and one year later, on 2010–2011 LEB Oro season was champion of the Copa Príncipe and runner-up of LEB Oro with Obradoiro CAB. He also finished in the All LEB Oro team.

In June 2014, Junyent suffered an eight-month injury and did not play the 2014–15 ACB season with Obradoiro.

Coaching career
In 2017, Junyent was hired for managing the reserve team of Obradoiro CAB at the fourth division.

National team
Junyent achieved the bronze medal with the Spanish U-19 team at the 1995 FIBA Under-19 World Championship and played also with the Spain national basketball team, playing the 2002 FIBA World Championship.

Honors

Trophies
With FC Barcelona
Liga ACB: 1999
Korać Cup: 1999
With CAI Zaragoza
Liga Española de Baloncesto: 2010
With Obradoiro CAB
Copa Príncipe: 2010

Individual awards
With Obradoiro CAB
All LEB Oro Team: 2011

References

External links
Profile at ACB.com
Profile at FEB.es

1976 births
Living people
Basket Zaragoza players
CB Granada players
CB Lucentum Alicante players
Centers (basketball)
FC Barcelona Bàsquet players
Liga ACB players
Obradoiro CAB players
Sportspeople from Sabadell
Spanish men's basketball players
2002 FIBA World Championship players
21st-century Spanish people